Margarete Haagen (29 November 1889 – 19 November 1966) was a German stage and film actress. Haagen appeared in over a hundred films during her career, generally in character roles. She specialised in playing good-natured elderly ladies. Following the Second World War, she appeared in several rubble films, such as In Those Days (1947). During the 1950s, she often appeared in heimatfilm and costume films.

Partial filmography

References

Bibliography 
 Ó Dochartaigh, Pól & Schönfeld, Christiane. Representing the Good German in Literature and Culture After 1945: Altruism and Moral Ambiguity. Camden House, 2013. 
 Shandley, Robert. Rubble Films: German Cinema in the Shadow of the Third Reich. Temple University Press, 2010.

External links 
 

1889 births
1966 deaths
German film actresses
German stage actresses
Actors from Nuremberg
20th-century German actresses